Armori Assembly constituency is one of the 288 Vidhan Sabha (legislative assembly) constituencies of Maharashtra state in central India.

Overview
Armori is one of the three Vidhan Sabha constituencies located in Gadchiroli district. and comprises the entire Desaiganj (Wadsa), Armori, Kurkheda and Korchi tehsils and part of Dhanora tehsil of the district. This constituency is reserved for the candidates belonging to the Scheduled tribes.

Armori is part of the Gadchiroli-Chimur Lok Sabha constituency along with five other Vidhan Sabha segments, namely Gadchiroli and Aheri in Gadchiroli district, Brahmapuri and Chimur in Chandrapur district and Amgaon in Gondia district.

Members of Legislative Assembly

See also
 Armori
 List of constituencies of Maharashtra Vidhan Sabha

References

Assembly constituencies of Maharashtra